Fereyduni (also Romanized as Fereydūnī) is a village in Baghestan Rural District, in the Eslamiyeh District of Ferdows County, South Khorasan Province, Iran. At the 2006 census, its population was 57, in 21 families.

References 

Populated places in Ferdows County